Graysville is the name of several places:

In the United States
Graysville, Alabama
Graysville, Georgia
Graysville, Indiana
Graysville, Missouri
Graysville, Ohio
Graysville, Tennessee

Elsewhere
 Graysville, Manitoba, Canada